Lemyra wernerthomasi is a moth in the family Erebidae first described by Hiroshi Inoue in 1993. It is found in Taiwan.

References

Moths described in 1992
wernerthomasi